Hermes Glacier is a glacier  long, flowing west into Weyerhaeuser Glacier in southern Graham Land, Antarctica. It was surveyed in January 1960 by the Falkland Islands Dependencies Survey who discovered the glacier after several fruitless attempts to find a route out of the mountains east of Earnshaw Glacier. It provided an ideal "road" back to known country and was therefore named after Hermes, the god of roads in Greek mythology. This name by the UK Antarctic Place-Names Committee initiated the idea of naming other features in this area after Greek gods.

References

Glaciers of Fallières Coast